Garo Baptist Convention is a Baptist Christian denomination of India and Bangladesh. It is named after the ethnic group of the name Garo. Most members of this church are in Meghalaya. In Bangladesh the central office of the GBC is located in Birisiri under the suburban area Susong Durgapur of Netrokona District, it was established in the year of 1890.

History
The Garo Baptist Convention consists of churches planted by the American Baptist missionaries since the mid-19th century in the state of Meghalaya.

Garo Baptist Convention is also a member of the Council of Baptist Churches in North-East India or CBCNEI, an umbrella organization of Baptist Churches in North-East India, which has other sister Baptist Associations such as the Nagaland Baptist Church Council, Karbi-Anglong Baptist Convention and Arunachal Baptist Church Council.

In Bangladesh there are 12,340 members, the other Baptist conventions are Bangladesh Baptist Church Sangha (member 15,000) and Bangladesh Baptist Fellowship.

Memberships
The Garo Baptist Convention had 2,619 churches and 333,908 baptized members in 2020.

Institutions

GBC runs the Harding Theological College in Tura, Meghalaya. GBC also runs the J.N.B. Memorial Baptist Training Institute in Birishiri, Mymensingh, Bangladesh.

See also 
 Council of Baptist Churches in Northeast India
 North East India Christian Council
 List of Christian denominations in North East India
 Bible
 Born again
 Worship service (evangelicalism)
 Jesus Christ
 Believers' Church

References

External links
 GBC in Bangladesh

1890 establishments in British India
Religion in Meghalaya
Baptist Christianity in Bangladesh
Baptist denominations in India
Baptist denominations in Asia
Christianity in Meghalaya